Dinitrogen oxide can potentially refer to any of at least four compounds:
Dinitrogen monoxide (nitrous oxide), N2O;
Dinitrogen dioxide, N2O2;
Dinitrogen trioxide, N2O3;
Dinitrogen tetroxide, N2O4, an unstable dimer of nitric oxide;
Dinitrogen pentoxide, N2O5.